Robert W. Olson (October 25, 1920 – April 16, 2013 in Hendersonville, North Carolina) was an American Seventh-day Adventist leader who was director of the Ellen G. White Estate from 1978 to 1990.

Biography 
Olson was the first staff member who was not a direct descendant of Ellen G. White to run her estate and the first staff member to hold a Ph.D. He had a wide variety of pastoral and administrative posts before joining the White Estate in the early 1970s. His leadership was characterized by a new openness to her writings (including the release of the controversial "Z file") and the release and publication of Ellen White's published writings on CD-ROM.

Publications 
 "101 Questions on the Sanctuary and on Ellen White" (PDF) (Washington, D.C.: Ellen G. White Estate, March 1981). Also appeared as a supplement to the Australasian Record of June 8, 1981)
 "The 'Shut Door' Documents" compilation, with occasional commentary. White Estate, 1982
 The Crisis Ahead: A Compilation From The Writings Of Ellen G. White, 1974 Published by College Bookstore, Angwin, California

See also 

 Ellen G. White Estate
 Seventh-day Adventist Church
 Seventh-day Adventist theology
 Seventh-day Adventist eschatology
 History of the Seventh-day Adventist Church
 Teachings of Ellen G. White
 Inspiration of Ellen G. White
 Prophecy in the Seventh-day Adventist Church
 Investigative judgment
 Pillars of Adventism
 Second Coming
 Ellen G. White
 Adventism
 Seventh-day Adventist Church Pioneers
 Seventh-day Adventist worship

References

Offline resources 
 Brief biography, a DVD extra in Prophetic Inspiration: The Holy Spirit at Work

Seventh-day Adventist religious workers
1920 births
2013 deaths
Ellen G. White Estate
Seventh-day Adventist administrators
American Seventh-day Adventists
History of the Seventh-day Adventist Church